Olga Dvirna (born 11 February 1953) is a retired female middle distance runner who represented the Soviet Union in the late 1970s and early 1980s. She set her personal best in the women's 1,500 metres (3:54.23) on July 27, 1982, at a meet in Kiev.

References

Profile

1953 births
Living people
Soviet female middle-distance runners
Ukrainian female middle-distance runners
European Athletics Championships medalists
Universiade medalists in athletics (track and field)
Universiade silver medalists for the Soviet Union
Medalists at the 1979 Summer Universiade
Medalists at the 1981 Summer Universiade
Sportspeople from Cherkasy Oblast